Yang Shuai is a Chinese short track speed skater.

He participated at the 2019 World Short Track Speed Skating Championships, winning the silver medal in the 5000 m relay.

References

External links
Yang Shuai at ISU

Living people
Chinese male short track speed skaters
World Short Track Speed Skating Championships medalists
Year of birth missing (living people)
21st-century Chinese people